Spialia colotes, the Bushveld sandman, is a butterfly of the family Hesperiidae. The species was first described by Herbert Druce in 1875. It is found in Angola, Botswana and from South Africa to Ethiopia and south-western Arabia.

These skippers are dark brown with white spots on both sides of the wings.

The wingspan is from 21–28 mm.

The flight period is from December to May, with a single brood.

The larvae feed on Hibiscus fuscus.

Subspecies
Spialia colotes colotes (Angola)
Spialia colotes semiconfluens de Jong, 1978 (Ethiopia, Somalia, eastern Kenya, north-eastern Uganda, south-western Arabia)
Spialia colotes transvaaliae (Trimen, 1889) - Transvaal grizzled skipper (South West Africa, Botswana, Transvaal, from Zimbabwe to Kenya)

References

External links
Image

Spialia
Butterflies described in 1875
Butterflies of Africa
Taxa named by Herbert Druce